The following lists events that happened during 1976 in Cambodia.

Incumbents 
 Chairman of State Presidium: Norodom Sihanouk (until 11 April), Khieu Samphan (starting 11 April)
 Prime Minister: 
 until 4 April: Penn Nouth 
 4 April-14 April: Khieu Samphan 
 14 April-27 September: Pol Pot 
 27 September-25 October: Nuon Chea 
 starting 25 October: Pol Pot

Events

January
 January 6 - Democratic Kampuchea was proclaimed as the government of Cambodia.

References 

 
1970s in Cambodia
Years of the 20th century in Cambodia
Cambodia
Cambodia